The L. A. Pomeroy House is a historic house located at 203 Laconia Street in Amherst, Wisconsin. It is locally significant as a distinctive of the Queen Anne style, which peaked in popularity in the United States in 1880–1910. It is also significant that Pomeroy, a well respected businessman chose local architect J. H. Jeffers to design his home.

Description and history 
It is a large, wood frame, 3-story, Late Victorian Queen Anne house consisting of approximately 3,000 square feet of living area on the first two floors. It was added to the National Register of Historic Places on November 5, 1992.

References

Houses completed in 1904
Houses in Portage County, Wisconsin
Houses on the National Register of Historic Places in Wisconsin
Queen Anne architecture in Wisconsin
National Register of Historic Places in Portage County, Wisconsin